Agatha of Sicily is a Christian saint. Her feast is on 5 February. Agatha was born in Catania, part of the Roman Province of Sicily, and was martyred . She is one of several virgin martyrs who are commemorated by name in the Canon of the Mass.

Agatha is the patron saint of Catania, Molise, Malta, San Marino, Gallipoli in Apulia, and Zamarramala, a municipality of the Province of Segovia in Spain. She is also the patron saint of breast cancer patients, martyrs, wet nurses, bell-founders, and bakers, and is invoked against fire, earthquakes, and eruptions of Mount Etna.

Early history
Agatha is buried at the Badia di Sant'Agata, Catania.

In the 6th century AD, the church was adapted to Arianism, hence its name "Saint Agatha of Goths", and later reconsecrated by Gregory the Great, who confirmed her traditional sainthood.

Agatha is also depicted in the mosaics of Sant'Apollinare Nuovo in Ravenna, where she appears, richly dressed, in the procession of female martyrs along the north wall. Her image forms an initial 'I' in the Sacramentary of Gellone, which dates from the end of the 8th century.

Life

One of the most highly venerated virgin martyrs of Christian antiquity, Agatha was put to death during the Decian persecution (250–253) in Catania, Sicily, for her determined profession of faith.

Her written legend comprises "straightforward accounts of interrogation, torture, resistance, and triumph which constitute some of the earliest hagiographic literature", and are reflected in later recensions, the earliest surviving one being an illustrated late 10th-century passio bound into a composite volume in the Bibliothèque nationale de France, originating probably in Autun, Burgundy; in its margin illustrations Magdalena Carrasco detected Carolingian or Late Antique iconographic traditions.

According to the 13th-century Golden Legend (III.15) by Jacobus de Voragine, 15-year-old Agatha, from a rich and noble family, made a vow of virginity and rejected the amorous advances of the Roman prefect Quintianus, who thought he could force her to turn away from her vow and marry him. His persistent proposals were consistently spurned by Agatha. This was during the persecutions of Decius, so Quintianus, knowing she was a Christian, reported her to the authorities. Quintianus himself was governor of the district.

Quintianus expected Agatha to give in to his demands when faced with torture and possible death, but Agatha simply reaffirmed her belief in God by praying: "Jesus Christ, Lord of all, you see my heart, you know my desires. Possess all that I am. I am your sheep: make me worthy to overcome the devil." To force her to change her mind, Quintianus sent Agatha to Aphrodisia, the keeper of a brothel, and had her imprisoned there; however, the punishment failed, with Agatha remaining a Christian.
 
Quintianus sent for Agatha again, arguing with her and threatening her, before finally having her imprisoned and tortured. She was stretched on a rack to be torn with iron hooks, burned with torches, and whipped. Her breasts were torn off with tongs.  After further dramatic confrontations with Quintianus, represented in a sequence of dialogues in her passio that document her fortitude and steadfast devotion, Agatha was then sentenced to be burnt at the stake; however, an earthquake prevented this from happening, and she was instead sent to prison, where St. Peter the Apostle appeared to her and healed her wounds.

Although the martyrdom of Agatha is authenticated, and her veneration as a saint had spread beyond her native place even in antiquity, there is no reliable information concerning the details of her death.

Osbern Bokenam, A Legend of Holy Women, written in the 1440s, offers some further detail.

Veneration
According to Maltese tradition, during the persecution of Roman Emperor Decius (AD 249–251), Agatha, together with some of her friends, fled from Sicily and took refuge in Malta. Some historians believe that her stay on the island was rather short, and she spent her days in a rock-hewn crypt at Rabat, praying and teaching Christianity to children. After some time, Agatha returned to Sicily, where she faced martyrdom. Agatha was arrested and brought before Quintianus, praetor of Catania, who condemned her to torture and imprisonment.

The crypt of St. Agatha is an underground basilica, which from early ages was venerated by the Maltese. At the time of St. Agatha's stay, the crypt was a small natural cave, which, later on, during the 4th or 5th century, was enlarged and embellished.

After the Reformation era, Agatha was retained in the calendar of the Church of England's Book of Common Prayer with her feast on 5 February. Several Church of England parish churches are dedicated to her.

A feast day to honor Agatha on 5 February was given final authorization in the Episcopal Church in 2022.

The translation of her relics is commemorated on 10 March and 17 August.

Festival of Saint Agatha in Catania

The Festival of Saint Agatha in Catania is a major festival in the region, it takes place in the first five days of February. The Catania Cathedral (also known as ) is dedicated to her.

Patronage

Saint Agatha is the patron saint of rape victims, breast cancer patients, wet nurses, and bellfounders (due to the shape of her severed breasts). She is also considered to be a powerful intercessor when people suffer from fires. Her feast day is celebrated on 5 February.

She is also a patron saint of Malta, where in 1551 her intercession through a reported apparition to a Benedictine nun is said to have saved Malta from Turkish invasion.

She became the patron saint of the Republic of San Marino after Pope Clement XII restored the independence of the state on her feast day of 5 February 1740.

She is also the patron saint of Catania, Sorihuela del Guadalimar (Spain), Molise, San Marino and Kalsa, a historical quarter of Palermo.

She is claimed as the patroness of Palermo. The year after her death, the stilling of an eruption of Mount Etna was attributed to her intercession. As a result, apparently, people continued to ask her prayers for protection against fire.

In Switzerland, Agatha is considered the patron saint of fire services.

In the United Kingdom, Agatha is the patron saint of bell ringers in service of the Catholic Church.

Iconography

Saint Agatha is often depicted iconographically carrying her excised breasts on a platter, as in Bernardino Luini's Saint Agatha (1510–1515) in the Galleria Borghese, Rome, in which Agatha contemplates the breasts on a standing salver held in her hand.

Legacy
The Basque people have a tradition of gathering on Saint Agatha's Eve and going round the village. Homeowners can choose to hear a song about her life, accompanied by the beats of their walking sticks on the floor or a prayer for the household's deceased. After that, the homeowner donates food to the chorus. This song has varying lyrics according to the local tradition and the Basque language. An exceptional case was that of 1937, during the Spanish Civil War, when a version appeared that in the Spanish language praised the Soviet ship Komsomol, which had sunk while carrying Soviet weapons to the Second Spanish Republic.

An annual festival to commemorate the life of Saint Agatha takes place in Catania, Sicily, from 3 to 5 February. The festival culminates in an all-night procession through the city.

St. Agatha's Tower is a former Knight's stronghold located in the north west of Malta. The seventeenth-century tower served as a military base during both World Wars and was used as a radar station by the Maltese army.

St. Agatha is also commemorated in literature. The Italian poet Martha Marchina wrote an epigram in  that commemorates her martyrdom. In it, Marchina characterizes Agatha as powerful and she reclaims that power because she has become more beautiful through her wounds.

Agatha of Sicily is honored with a Lesser Feast on the liturgical calendar of the Episcopal Church in the United States of America on 5 February.

In art

Agatha is a featured figure on Judy Chicago's 1979 installation piece The Dinner Party, being represented as one of the 999 names on the Heritage Floor.

See also 

 Incorruptibility
 List of Catholic saints
 Saint Agatha of Sicily, patron saint archive
 Santa Gadea, a church of historical importance devoted to Agatha, located in Burgos
 Breast tax, Breast tax in Travancore
 Nangeli, Woman who cut her breast in protest Nangeli

Further reading
Of Saint Agatha in "Ælfric's Lives of Saints", by Ælfric of Eynsham London, Pub. for the Early English text society, by N. Trübner & co. (1881).

Notes

References

External links

"St Agatha - St Peter's Square Colonnades"
"Here Followeth the Life of St. Agatha," from Jacobus Voragine, The Golden Legend, tr. William Caxton.
 "Saint Agatha of Sicily" at the Christian Iconography website
Butler, Alban. The Lives of the Fathers, Martyrs and Other Principal Saints, Vol. I, D. & J. Sadlier, & Company, 1864
 "Saint Agatha Movie" at the Delusion website
 The Saint Agatha Virgin and Martyr Catholic Church" at the Nova Crnja municipality.
 The Votive Aedicules in honour of Saint Agata in Catania 

231 births
251 deaths
Italian saints
Sicilian saints
3rd-century Roman women
3rd-century Christian martyrs
3rd-century Christian saints
Year of birth unknown
Virgin martyrs
National symbols of Malta
Ante-Nicene Christian female saints
Anglican saints